2009 China Open can refer to:
2009 China Open (tennis), a tennis tournament
2009 China Open Super Series, a badminton tournament
China Open 2009 (snooker), a snooker tournament